Miss Europe 1966 was the 29th edition of the Miss Europe pageant and the 18th edition under the Mondial Events Organization. It was held at the Palais de la Méditerranée in Nice, France on 30 May 1966. Maria Dornier of France, was crowned Miss Europe 1966, by outgoing titleholder Juliana Herm of Germany.

Results

Placements

Contestants 

 - Eva Rieck
 - Mireille De Man
 - Gitte Fleinert
 - Janice Carol Whiteman
 - Satu Charlotta Östring
 - Maria Dornier
 - Tove-Regina Neitzel
 - Stivi Vikardzi (Stivi Vikartzi)
 - Margo Isabelle Domen
 - Rósa Einarsdóttir
 - Gladys Anne Waller (Ann Waller)
 - Alba Rigazzi
 - Gigi Antinori
 - Siri Gro Nilsen
 - Rafaela Roque Sánchez
 - Gun-Inger Anna Andersson
 - Hedy Frick
 - Hülya Aşan

References

External links 
 

Miss Europe
1966 beauty pageants
1966 in France